Rho Cassiopeiae (ρ Cas, ρ Cassiopeiae) is a yellow hypergiant star in the constellation Cassiopeia. On average it has an absolute magnitude of −9.5, making it visually one of the most luminous stars known.

Rho Cassiopeiae is a single star, and is categorized as a semiregular variable.  As a yellow hypergiant, it is one of the rarest types of stars.  Only a few dozen are known in the Milky Way, but it is not the only one in its constellation which also contains V509 Cassiopeiae.

Observation

The Bayer designation for this star was established in 1603 as part of the Uranometria, a star catalog produced by Johann Bayer. The star catalog by John Flamsteed published in 1712, which orders the stars in each constellation by their right ascension, gave this star the Flamsteed designation 7 Cassiopeiae.

Rho Cas was first described as variable in 1901.  It was classified only as "pec." with a small but definite range of variation.  Its nature continued to be unclear during the deep visual minimum in 1946, although it was presumed to be related to the detection of an expanding shell around the star.  The spectrum developed lower excitation features described as typical of an M star rather than the previous F8 class.  The nature of Rho Cas was eventually clarified as a massive luminous unstable star, pulsating and losing mass, and occasionally becoming obscured by strong bouts of mass loss.

Rho Cas usually has an apparent magnitude near 4.5, but in 1946 it unexpectedly dimmed to 6th magnitude and cooled by over 3,000 Kelvin, before returning to its previous brightness.  A similar eruption was recorded in 1893, suggesting that it undergoes these eruptions approximately once every 50 years.  This happened again in 2000–2001, when it was observed by the William Herschel Telescope.

In 2013, a shell ejection produced dramatic spectral changes and a drop of about half a magnitude at visual wavelengths.  Weak emission lines of metals and doubled H-α absorption lines were detected in late 2014, and unusual tripled absorption lines in 2017.  The brightness peaked at magnitude 4.3 before fading to 5th magnitude.  In 2018 it brightened again to magnitude 4.2.

The original Hipparcos parallax publication estimated Rho Cas at around 0.28 mas, which would have corresponded to a distance around 10,000 light years and would have made Rho Cas among the farthest stars visible to the naked eye. However, more recent publications estimate Rho Cas with a much larger parallax, corresponding to a much shorter distance.

Properties

Rho Cassiopeiae is one of the most luminous yellow stars known. It is close to the Eddington luminosity limit and normally loses mass at around /yr, hundreds of millions of times the rate of the solar wind. Approximately every 50 years it undergoes a larger outburst and blows off a substantial fraction of its atmosphere, causing the temperature to drop around 1,500 K and the brightness to drop by up to 1.5 magnitudes. In 2000–2001 the mass loss rate jumped to /yr, ejecting in total approximately 3% of a solar mass or 10,000 Earth masses.

Surface abundances of most heavy elements on Rho Cas are enhanced relative to the Sun, but carbon and oxygen are depleted. This is expected for a massive star where hydrogen fusion takes place predominantly via the CNO cycle. In addition to the expected helium and nitrogen convected to the surface, sodium is strongly enhanced, indicating that the star had experienced a dredge-up while in a red supergiant stage. Therefore, it is expected that Rho Cas is now evolving towards hotter temperatures. It is currently core helium burning through the triple alpha process.

 The relatively low mass and high luminosity of a post-red supergiant star is a source of instability, pushing it close to the Eddington Limit. However, yellow hypergiants lie in a temperature range where opacity variations in zones of partial ionisation of hydrogen and helium cause pulsations, similar to the cause of Cepheid variable pulsations. In hypergiants, these pulsations are generally irregular and small, but combined with the overall instability of the outer layers of the star they can result in larger outbursts. This may all be part of an evolutionary trend towards hotter temperatures through the loss of the star's atmosphere.

Naming
ρ Cassiopeiae is a member of the Chinese constellation Flying Serpent , in the Encampment mansion.  In order, the 22 member stars are α and 4 Lacertae, π2 and π1 Cygni, stars 5 and 6, HD 206267, 13 and ε Cephei, β Lacertae, σ, ρ, τ, and AR Cassiopeiae, 9 Lacertae, 3, 7, 8, λ, ψ, κ, and ι Andromedae. Consequently, the Chinese name for ρ Cassiopeiae is 

References

External links
Rho Cassiopeiae fact sheet
David Darling site
Big and Giant Stars: Rho Cassiopeiae

Cassiopeia (constellation)
Cassiopeiae, Rho
Cassiopeiae, 07
G-type hypergiants
Semiregular variable stars
117863
224014
9045
BD+56 3111